Kurt Andersen (born August 22, 1954) is an American writer and was the host of the Peabody-winning public radio program Studio 360, a production of Public Radio International, Slate, and WNYC.

Early life and education
Andersen was born in Omaha, Nebraska. He graduated from Westside High School. He graduated magna cum laude from Harvard College.

Journalism
While a student at Harvard, he edited the Harvard Lampoon. In 1986, with E. Graydon Carter he co-founded Spy magazine, which they sold in 1991; it continued publishing until 1998. While writing for Spy, Andersen and Carter coined the notable insult "short-fingered vulgarian" for future United States President Donald Trump. He has been a writer and columnist for New York ("The Imperial City"), The New Yorker ("The Culture Industry"), and Time ("Spectator"). He was also the architecture and design critic for Time for nine years.

In 1996, Bill Reilly fired Andersen after two and a half years from his position as editor-in-chief at New York, citing the publication's financial results. Andersen attributed the firing to his refusal to kill a story about a rivalry between investment bankers Felix Rohatyn and Steven Rattner that had upset Henry Kravis, the principal of the publishing firm's ownership group.

In 1999, he co-founded an online media news website and biweekly magazine called Inside,  which in 2001, he and his co-founders sold to Steven Brill/Primedia; PriMedia closed the site in October 2001. 

From 2001 to 2004, he served as a senior creative consultant to Barry Diller's Universal Television, and from 2003 to 2005 as editorial director of Colors magazine. More recently, he co-founded the email cultural curation service Very Short List and was a guest op-ed columnist for The New York Times and editor-at-large for Random House.

He co-created Studio 360, a weekly program covering the arts and culture, which he hosted from its launch in 2000 to its last episode in 2020. It was broadcast on 240 U.S. stations, and remains available as a podcast.

Literary works
Andersen is the author of three novels, including Turn of the Century (Random House, 1999), which was a national bestseller and New York Times Notable Book of the Year, and the New York Times bestseller Heyday (Random House, 2007), which won the Langum Prize for the best American historical fiction of 2007. Random House published his third novel, True Believers, in the summer of 2012, and it was named one of the best novels of that year by the San Francisco Chronicle and the Washington Post. His short fiction has been published in anthologies such as Stories: All-New Tales (HarperCollins, 2010).

Andersen has also published a book of humorous essays, The Real Thing (Doubleday, 1980; Holt, 1982; Bison Press, 2008), about "quintessentialism", and co-authored two humor books, Tools of Power (Viking, 1980), a parody of self-help books on becoming successful, and Loose Lips (Simon & Schuster, 1995), an anthology of edited transcripts of real-life conversations involving celebrated people. Along with Carter and George Kalogerakis he assembled a history and greatest-hits anthology of Spy called Spy: The Funny Years, published in 2006 by Miramax Books.

He also wrote Reset (Random House, 2009), an essay about the causes and aftermath of the Great Recession, and he has contributed to many other books, such as Spark: How Creativity Works (HarperCollins, 2011), and Fields of Vision: The Photographs of John Vachon (Library of Congress, 2010).

In 2017, he published two books, Fantasyland: How America Went Haywire: A 500-Year History, which explains American society's peculiar susceptibility to falsehoods and illusions (Random House), and with Alec Baldwin You Can't Spell America Without Me: The Really Tremendous Inside Story of My Fantastic First Year As President (Penguin), a parody Trump memoir. Excerpts from Fantasyland appeared as a cover story in The Atlantic, and in Slate. Both books were New York Times bestsellers, and Fantasyland, which the Times Book Review called "a great revisionist history of America," reached #3 on the nonfiction list.

In August 2020, he published Evil Geniuses: The Unmaking of America, which examines the coordinated efforts to achieve conservative economical and political changes in the United States from the 1970s to 2020, and discusses how the resulting unfettered laissez-faire approach to capitalism has resulted in an extreme level of economic inequality.

Personal life
Andersen lives in Brooklyn, New York, with his wife, author Anne Kreamer and two daughters Kate and Lucy.

Bibliography

Books
Novels
 Turn of the Century (Random House, 1999)
 Heyday (Random House, 2007)
 True Believers (Random House, 2012)

Humor
 The Real Thing (Doubleday, 1980; Holt, 1982; Bison Press, 2008)
 Tools of Power: The Elitist's Guide to the Ruthless Exploitation of Everybody and Everything (Viking, 1980)
 Loose Lips: Real Words, Real People, Real Funny (with Jamie Malanowski and Lisa Birnbach) (Simon & Schuster, 1995)
 Spy : The Funny Years (with George Kalogerakis and Graydon Carter) (Miramax Books, 2006)
 You Can't Spell America Without Me: The Really Tremendous Inside Story of My Fantastic First Year As President (with Alec Baldwin) (Penguin, 2017)
 Hasta La Vista America: Trump's Farewell Address

Non-fiction
 Reset (Random House, 2009)
 Fantasyland: How America Went Haywire: A 500-Year History (Random House, 2017) 
 Evil Geniuses: The Unmaking of America: A Recent History (Penguin Random House, 2020)

Essays, reporting, and other contributions
 
 Anderson, Kurt, The Anti-vaccine Right Brought Human Sacrifice to America, The Atlantic'', January 25, 2022

References

External links
 
 Official website
 Studio 360
 Appearance on The Filter Podcast
 

1954 births
Living people
20th-century American male writers
20th-century American non-fiction writers
20th-century American novelists
21st-century American male writers
21st-century American non-fiction writers
21st-century American novelists
American atheists
American columnists
American magazine founders
American magazine staff writers
American male non-fiction writers
American male novelists
People with type 1 diabetes
American talk radio hosts
The Atlantic (magazine) people
Harvard College alumni
The Harvard Lampoon alumni
Novelists from New York (state)
Public Radio International personalities
Time (magazine) people
Vanity Fair (magazine) people
Writers from Omaha, Nebraska